Pilsley may refer to two places in England:
Pilsley, Derbyshire Dales
Pilsley, North East Derbyshire
Pilsley railway station, in use 1893–1959